Agaricus alabamensis is a North American species of mushroom in the genus Agaricus. This species is in the family Agaricaceae. Its spores have a dark chocolate color.

References

alabamensis
Fungi of North America